The 1962 season of the Paraguayan Primera División, the top category of Paraguayan football, was played by 11 teams. The national champions were Olimpia.

Results

Standings

Promotion/relegation play-offs

External links
Paraguay 1962 season at RSSSF

Para
Paraguayan Primera División seasons
Primera